In enzymology, a beta-primeverosidase is an enzyme that catalyzes the chemical reaction

a 6-O-(beta-D-xylopyranosyl)-beta-D-glucopyranoside + H2O  6-O-(beta-D-xylopyranosyl)-beta-D-glucopyranose + an alcohol

Thus, the two substrates of this enzyme are 6-O-(beta-D-xylopyranosyl)-beta-D-glucopyranoside and H2O, whereas its two products are 6-O-(beta-D-xylopyranosyl)-beta-D-glucopyranose and alcohol.

This enzyme belongs to the family of hydrolases, specifically those glycosidases that hydrolyse O- and S-glycosyl compounds.  The systematic name of this enzyme class is 6-O-(beta-D-xylopyranosyl)-beta-D-glucopyranoside 6-O-(beta-D-xylosyl)-beta-D-glucohydrolase.

References

 
 

EC 3.2.1
Enzymes of unknown structure